A shore facility is one of the facilities located on shore used for receiving ships and transferring cargo and people to them.  Ports and marinas constitute a collection of shore facilities.  Shore facilities are designed for the efficient intermodal transportation of goods and people inland by trains, surface vehicles, and/or pipelines.

A shore facility may include magazine buildings or warehouses for storage of goods, fuel storage tanks or refrigerated storage. 
It may include loading cranes, equipment laydown areas, dry docks and custom houses.  It may have quays, wharfs, jetties, or slipways with cranes or ramps.
It may also have breakwaters, piers, or mooring dolphins.

Coastal construction